William Lansing Gleason (November 18, 1899 – January 13, 1991) was a three-term mayor of Eau Gallie, Florida from 1930 to 1943 and 1950 to 1951.

He was the son of William Henry Hunt Gleason, who was also mayor, and Flora Belle Lansing Gleason. His grandfather was William Henry Gleason, the founder of Eau Gallie, Florida, and 2nd Lieutenant Governor of Florida.

He was involved in the local community including donating a coquina rock slab that the first school house in Brevard County now sits on at the Florida Institute of Technology.  The auditorium on the campus of Florida Institute of Technology is named for him.  Gleason Park was named for him. Lansing Island was also named for him.

William Lansing Gleason also co-founded Indian Harbour Beach, Florida on June 6, 1955.

References

External material
Melbourne Bicentennial Book. July 4, 1976. Noreda B. McKemy and Elaine Murray Stone. Library of Congress: 76-020298
Florida Tech Visitor's Guide - Page 5
Florida Institute of Technology Press Release October 2, 2005
Indian Harbour Beach City Homepage

1899 births
1991 deaths
American city founders
People from Indian Harbour Beach, Florida
20th-century American politicians
People from Eau Gallie, Florida
Lieutenant Governors of Florida